Arbutus mollis is a species of plant in the heath family. It is found in Mexico.

References

mollis
Endemic flora of Mexico